Democratic Association of Hungarian Women (MNDSz) was a state women's organization in Communist Hungary, founded in 1945. It was a state organization and a branch of the Communist Party. It was formally dissolved in 1956, but was refounded under a new name and continued to function until 1989. 

Its purpose was to mobilise women in the political ideology of the state, as well as to enforce the party's policy within gender roles and women's rights. It played an important role in the life of women in the state during its existence.

References

 Marilyn Rueschemeyer, Women in the Politics of Postcommunist Eastern Europe
 

Social history of Hungary
Women's organisations based in Hungary
History of women in Hungary
Feminist organizations in Europe
Political organizations
Organizations established in 1945
1989 disestablishments